Diana Ramírez is a Colombian karateka. 

In 2021, Ramírez competed in the World Karate Championships held in Dubai, United Arab Emirates. She won one of the bronze medals in the women's team kumite event. 

Ramírez won the bronze medal in the women's -61 kg event at the 2022 Bolivarian Games held in Valledupar, Colombia.

References 

Date of birth missing (living people)
Living people
Place of birth missing (living people)
Colombian female karateka
21st-century Colombian women